KSGF (1260 kHz) is an AM radio station licensed to serve Springfield, Missouri, United States.  The station, which launched in 1926 as KGBX, is owned by SummitMedia.  The station is also simulcast on 104.1 FM, which is licensed to Ash Grove, Missouri, United States.

Programming
KSGF broadcasts a News/Talk radio format. Weekday programming includes a local morning show called, "KSGF Mornings with Nick Reed," hosted by Nick Reed with executive producer Sarah Myers. The remainder of the weekday is taken up by syndicated shows hosted by Glenn Beck, Dana Loesch, Sean Hannity, Mark Levin, Michael Savage, the Red Eye Radio, and Ben Shapiro. Weekend programming includes Kim Komando, Joe Pags, and Cigar Dave. Local news comes from the KTTS news team and national news comes from Fox News Radio.

History

The beginning
This station first began broadcasting experimentally in August 1926 with the call sign 9AYM on a frequency of 325 meters (922 kHz). The station was later licensed in 1926 as KGBX on 1040 kHz in St. Joseph, Missouri. The station was set up by entrepreneur Ralph D. Foster and partner Jerry Hall at the Foster-Hall Tire Co. to advertise their Firestone Tire dealership. The original studios were located in the Foster-Hall tire store at 1221 Frederick Avenue in St. Joseph. By mid-1930 KGBX had changed frequencies to 1310 kHz and by mid-1931 the station had been sold to KGBX Inc.  In 1932, after the partnership dissolved, KGBX relocated to Springfield, Missouri, and by 1942 had changed frequencies to the current 1260 kHz.  In 1944, KGBX was acquired by the Springfield Broadcasting Company. This new company was under the ownership of the publishers of the Springfield News & Leader and Springfield Leader & Press daily newspapers.

An era of change
After more than three decades of continuous ownership, Springfield Broadcasting Company sold KGBX to Stauffer Communications, Inc., on May 13, 1977.  In January 1983, Stauffer Communications, Inc., reached an agreement to sell the station to Springcom, Inc.  The deal was approved by the FCC on February 25, 1983, and the transaction was consummated on March 8, 1983.

In February 1986, Springcom, Inc., contracted to sell the station to KGBX Communications, Inc.  The deal was approved by the FCC on March 18, 1986, and the transaction was consummated on April 7, 1986.  This ownership would prove short-lived as KGBX Communications, Inc., made a deal in August 1987 to sell this station to Springfield Great Empire Broadcasting, Inc.  While approval for the sale was pending, the station applied to the Federal Communications Commission for a new callsign and was assigned KTTS on September 14, 1987.  The deal was approved by the FCC on September 29, 1987.

In October 1998, after a number of internal shifts in the ownership of the license holder, Springfield Great Empire Broadcasting, Inc., agreed to transfer the broadcast license for KTTS to Great Empire Broadcasting, Inc.  The deal was approved by the FCC on October 26, 1998, and the transaction was consummated on June 30, 1999.  This too would prove a short-lived change.

The present
Great Empire Broadcasting, Inc., reached an agreement in July 1999 to sell this station to Journal Broadcast Corporation.  The deal was approved by the FCC on July 20, 1999, and the transaction was consummated on July 27, 1999.

The new owners applied to the FCC for new call letters and the station was assigned KTTF on April 18, 2001.  The station was assigned the current KSGF call letters by the FCC on June 14, 2002.

Journal Communications and the E. W. Scripps Company announced on July 30, 2014 that the two companies would merge to create a new broadcast company under the E.W. Scripps Company name that owned the two companies' broadcast properties, including KSGF. The transaction was completed in 2015, pending shareholder and regulatory approvals. Scripps exited radio in 2018; the Springfield stations went to SummitMedia in a four-market, $47 million deal completed on November 1, 2018.

References

External links
KSGF official website

SGF (AM)
News and talk radio stations in the United States
Radio stations established in 1926
Greene County, Missouri
1926 establishments in Missouri